The 2017 Road to the Kentucky Derby was a series of races through which horses qualified for the 2017 Kentucky Derby, which was held on May 6. The field for the Derby was limited to 20 horses, with up to four 'also eligibles' in case of a late withdrawal from the field.

The Road to the Kentucky Derby gives points to the top four finishers in specified races. The 2017 season consisted of 35 races, 19 races for the Kentucky Derby Prep Season and 16 races for the Kentucky Derby Championship Season. Earnings in non-restricted stakes acted as a tie breaker. The races for the 2017 series were mostly the same as in the 2016 series, except that the Sam F. Davis stakes replaced the Iroquois Stakes.

On September 12, 2016, Churchill Downs announced the introduction of a separate Japan Road to the Kentucky Derby, which consisted of two races: the Cattleya Sho on November 26, 2016 and the Hyacinth on February 19, 2017. The winner of this series was offered one of the 20 positions available in the Kentucky Derby starting gate. However, the offer was declined by the connections of the winner, Epicharis, and those of the two runners-up. Therefore, all 20 positions and the 'also eligibles' were determined through the regular Road to the Kentucky Derby.

Standings

The following table shows the points earned in the eligible races. Entries for the Kentucky Derby were taken on May 3. The race was won by Always Dreaming.

 Winner of Kentucky Derby in bold
 Entrants for Kentucky Derby in blue
 "Also eligible" for Kentucky Derby in green 
 Sidelined/Inactive/No longer under Derby Consideration/Not nominated in gray

Prep season

Note: 1st=10 points; 2nd=4 points; 3rd=2 points; 4th=1 point (except the Breeders' Cup Juvenile: 1st=20 points; 2nd=8 points; 3rd=4 points; 4th=2 point)

Championship series

First leg of series
Note: 1st=50 points; 2nd=20 points; 3rd=10 points; 4th=5 points

Second leg of series
These races are the major preps for the Kentucky Derby, and are thus weighted more heavily. Note: 1st=100 points; 2nd=40 points; 3rd=20 points; 4th=10 points

"Wild Card"
Note: 1st=10 points; 2nd=4 points; 3rd=2 points; 4th=1 point

Japan Road to the Kentucky Derby

The Japan Road to the Kentucky Derby is intended to provide a place in the Derby starting gate to the top finisher in the series. If the connections of that horse decline the invitation, their place is offered to the second-place finisher and if necessary to the third-place finisher. If neither of the top three accept, this place in the starting gate reverts to the 20th-place finisher on the regular road to the Derby. For 2017, the top three-finishers in the Japan Road declined the offer.

Note: Cattleya Sho: 1st=40 points; 2nd=16 points; 3rd=8 points; 4th=4 points
Note: Hyacinth: 1st=50 points; 2nd=20 points; 3rd=10 points; 4th=5 points

See also
2017 Road to the Kentucky Oaks

Notes

References

External links

Road to the Kentucky Derby, 2017
Road to the Kentucky Derby
Road to the Kentucky Derby